Sullivan Heights is a compact group of mountains in western Antarctica rising to  in Mount Levack centered  east-northeast of Mount Tyree in the Sentinel Range, Ellsworth Mountains. The heights are encompassed by the flow of the Crosswell, Ellen, and Dater Glaciers, with their interior drained also by Pulpudeva and Strinava Glaciers. Separated from Vinson Massif to the south-southwest by Vranya Pass.

The feature was named in 1997 by the Advisory Committee on Antarctic Names (US-ACAN) after Cornelius Wayne Sullivan (b. 1943), American oceanographer; United States Antarctic Program (USAP) field team leader for Sea Ice Microbial Communities (SIMCO) studies in McMurdo Sound, 1980–86, 1988, 1989; chief scientist and cruise coordinator for AMERIEZ (Antarctic Marine Ecosystem Research at the Ice Edge Zone) projects in Weddell Sea, Nov–Dec 1983, Feb–Apr 1986, June–July 1988; Professor of Biological Science, Hancock Institute of Marine Studies, Director, 1991–93; Director, Office of Polar Programs, National Science Foundation, 1993–97.

Maps
Vinson Massif.  Scale 1:250 000 topographic map.  Reston, Virginia: US Geological Survey, 1988.

Features
Geographical features include:

 Crosswell Glacier
 Dater Glacier
 Johnson Col
 Mamarchev Peak
 Mount Farrell
 Mount Levack
 Mount Segers
 Nebeska Peak
 Pulpudeva Glacier
 Strinava Glacier
 Vranya Pass
 Zmeevo Pass

References
Sullivan Heights. SCAR Composite Antarctic Gazetteer

Mountains of Ellsworth Land